The IV Army Corps / IV AK was a corps level command of the Prussian and then the Imperial German Armies from the 19th Century to World War I.

It was established on 3 October 1815 as the General Command in the Duchy of Saxony (Generalkommando im Herzogtum Sachsen) and became the IV Army Corps on August 30, 1818.  Its headquarters was in Magdeburg and its catchment area included the Prussian Province of Saxony and the adjacent Saxon Duchies (Saxe-Altenburg, Anhalt) and Principalities (Schwarzburg-Sondershausen, Schwarzburg-Rudolstadt, Reuss Elder Line and Reuss Junior Line).

In peacetime, the Corps was assigned to the VI Army Inspectorate but joined the 1st Army at the start of the First World War.  It was still in existence at the end of the war in the 6th Army, Heeresgruppe Kronprinz Rupprecht on the Western Front.  The Corps was disbanded with the demobilisation of the German Army after World War I.

Austro-Prussian War 
The IV Corps formed part of Prince Friedrich Karl of Prussia's 1st Army and fought in the Austro-Prussian War against Austria in 1866, including the Battle of Königgrätz.

Franco-Prussian War 
In the Franco-Prussian War of 1870-71, the Corps formed part of the 2nd Army that was commanded by Prince Friedrich Karl of Prussia.  It saw action in the battles of Beaumont and Sedan, and in the Siege of Paris.

Peacetime organisation 
The 25 peacetime Corps of the German Army (Guards, I - XXI, I - III Bavarian) had a reasonably standardised organisation. Each consisted of two divisions with usually two infantry brigades, one field artillery brigade and a cavalry brigade each.  Each brigade normally consisted of two regiments of the appropriate type, so each Corps normally commanded 8 infantry, 4 field artillery and 4 cavalry regiments. There were exceptions to this rule:
V, VI, VII, IX and XIV Corps each had a 5th infantry brigade (so 10 infantry regiments)
II, XIII, XVIII and XXI Corps had a 9th infantry regiment
I, VI and XVI Corps had a 3rd cavalry brigade (so 6 cavalry regiments)
the Guards Corps had 11 infantry regiments (in 5 brigades) and 8 cavalry regiments (in 4 brigades).
Each Corps also directly controlled a number of other units. This could include one or more 
Foot Artillery Regiment
Jäger Battalion
Pioneer Battalion
Train Battalion

World War I

Organisation on mobilisation 
On mobilization on 2 August 1914 the Corps was restructured.  8th Cavalry Brigade was withdrawn to form part of the 2nd Cavalry Division and the 7th Cavalry Brigade was broken up: the 10th Hussar Regiment was raised to a strength of 6 squadrons before being split into two half-regiments of 3 squadrons each and the half-regiments were assigned as divisional cavalry to 7th and 8th Divisions; the 16th Uhlan Regiment was likewise assigned as two half-regiments to 13th and 14th Divisions of VII Corps.  Divisions received engineer companies and other support units from the Corps headquarters.  In summary, IV Corps mobilised with 25 infantry battalions, 9 machine gun companies (54 machine guns), 6 cavalry squadrons, 24 field artillery batteries (144 guns), 4 heavy artillery batteries (16 guns), 3 pioneer companies and an aviation detachment.

Combat chronicle 
On mobilisation, IV Corps was assigned to the 1st Army on the right wing of the forces for the Schlieffen Plan offensive in August 1914 on the Western Front.  It participated in the Battle of Mons and the First Battle of the Marne which marked the end of the German advances in 1914.  Later, it participated in the Battle of the Somme, particularly the Battle of Delville Wood and the Battle of Pozières.

It was still in existence at the end of the war in the 6th Army, Heeresgruppe Kronprinz Rupprecht on the Western Front.

49th Landwehr Brigade 
During the war, the 49th Landwehr Brigade joined the corps; it had originally been part of 4th Army.  It had its headquarters at Bois de Lord farm on the River Aisne for most of the First World War. From 1915 the 49th Landwehr Brigade was commanded by Lt. General Hans von Blumenthal, who had retired in 1910 after disagreements with his commanding officer General Maximilian von Prittwitz. On the outbreak of war he had returned to active service, first to command 60th Landwehr Brigade.

Commanders 
The IV Corps had the following commanders during its existence:

See also 

Franco-Prussian War order of battle
German Army order of battle (1914)
German Army order of battle, Western Front (1918)
List of Imperial German infantry regiments
List of Imperial German artillery regiments
List of Imperial German cavalry regiments
Order of battle at Mons
Order of battle of the First Battle of the Marne

References

Bibliography 
 
 
 
 
 

Corps of Germany in World War I
Military units and formations established in 1815
Military units and formations disestablished in 1919